Paula María Bertol (born 22 February 1965) is an Argentinian legislator. She is a member of PRO and favored a ban on indoor smoking. She is on the Global Organization of Parliamentarians Against Corruption board and received an "Award for Innovative Legislation" from the Civil Society Network.

References

External links 
Paula María Bertol page

Members of the Argentine Chamber of Deputies elected in Buenos Aires
Republican Proposal politicians
Living people
Women members of the Argentine Chamber of Deputies
21st-century Argentine women politicians
21st-century Argentine politicians
1965 births